The Riverboat Coffee House was a Canadian coffeehouse located at 134 Yorkville Avenue in the Yorkville neighbourhood of Toronto, Ontario, Canada. It was a key venue for folk rock music and singer songwriter music made famous for featuring high-profile acts, and is considered to be "the best-known coffee house in Canada." It opened in October 1964 and closed on June 25, 1978.

History 
The Riverboat was owned by Bernie & Patricia (a.k.a. Sola, a well-known artist) Fiedler. Located in a basement, its decor was modelled after the interior of a boat, featuring port hole windows and intimate booths. Legend has it that American protest singer Phil Ochs wrote one of his best-known songs, "Changes", on the back porch.

Notable performers 
Numerous Canadian artists, including Lenny Breau, Joni Mitchell, Neil Young, Ian & Sylvia, Gordon Lightfoot, Bruce Cockburn and Murray McLauchlan, played the Riverboat. A frequent stop on the touring circuit, many American artists, such as John Lee Hooker, James Taylor, Tim Hardin, Simon and Garfunkel, and Phil Ochs, also appeared there.

Live albums recorded 
Live at the Riverboat 1969 by Neil Young

Songs written at or about the Riverboat 
 Gordon Lightfoot. "Steel Rail Blues" Lightfoot!
 Joni Mitchell. "Night in the City" Song to a Seagull
 Neil Young. "Ambulance Blues" On the Beach
 Phil Ochs. "Changes" Phil Ochs in Concert

References

External links
 Riverboat coffee house archival photographs from the Clara Thomas Archives and Special Collections, York University

Buildings and structures in Toronto
Demolished buildings and structures in Toronto
Folk music venues
Music venues in Toronto
Coffeehouses and cafés in Canada
1964 establishments in Ontario
1978 disestablishments in Ontario